The Alpine orogeny or Alpide orogeny is an orogenic phase in the Late Mesozoic (Eoalpine) and the current Cenozoic that has formed the mountain ranges of the Alpide belt.

The cause of Alpine orogeny
The Alpine orogeny is caused by the continents Africa, Arabia and India and the small Cimmerian Plate colliding (from the south) with Eurasia in the north. Convergent movements between the tectonic plates (the African Plate, the Arabian Plate and the Indian Plate from the south, the Eurasian Plate from the north, and many smaller plates and microplates) had already begun in the early Cretaceous, but the major phases of mountain building began in the Paleocene to Eocene. The process continues currently in some of the Alpide mountain ranges.

The Alpine orogeny is considered one of the three major phases of orogeny in Europe that define the geology of that continent, along with the Caledonian orogeny that formed the Old Red Sandstone Continent when the continents Baltica and Laurentia collided in the early Paleozoic, and the Hercynian or Variscan orogeny that formed Pangaea when Gondwana and the Old Red Sandstone Continent collided in the middle to late Paleozoic.

Mountain ranges included
These mountains include (from west to east) the Atlas, the Rif, the Baetic Cordillera, the Cantabrian Mountains, the Pyrenees, the Alps, the Apennine Mountains, the Dinaric Alps, the Albanian Alps (Albanides), the Pindus (Hellenides), the Carpathians, the Balkanides (the Balkan Mountains and Rila-Rhodope massifs), the Pontic Mountains, the Taurus, the Antitaurus, the Armenian Highlands, the Caucasus, the Alborz, the Zagros, the Hajar, the Hindu Kush, the Pamir, the Karakoram, and the Himalayas.

Sometimes other names occur to describe the formation of separate mountain ranges: for example Carpathian orogeny for the Carpathians, Hellenic orogeny for the Pindus, Altai orogeny for the Altai Mountains or the Himalayan orogeny for the Himalayas.

The Alpine orogeny and more distant mountains
The Alpine orogeny has also led to the formation of more distant and smaller geological features such as the Weald–Artois Anticline in Southern England and northern France, the remains of which can be seen in the chalk ridges of the North and South Downs in southern England. Its effects are particularly visible on the Isle of Wight, where the Chalk Group and overlying Eocene strata are folded to near-vertical, as seen in exposures at Alum Bay and Whitecliff Bay, and on the Dorset coast near Lulworth Cove. Stresses arising from the Alpine orogeny caused the Cenozoic uplift of the Sudetes mountain range and possibly faulted rocks as far away as Öland in southern Sweden during the Paleocene.

See also
Andean orogeny
Fault block
Fold mountains
Geology of the Alps
Geology of the Himalaya

References

External links

Orogenies of Africa
Orogenies of Asia
Orogenies of Europe
Geology of the Alps
Mesozoic orogenies
Cenozoic orogenies
Geology of Algeria
Geology of Morocco
Geology of Spain